Teghnit may refer to:
 Teghnit-e Olya
 Teghnit-e Vasat